Nesochoris is a genus of moths belonging to the family Tortricidae.

Species
Nesochoris brachystigma  Clarke, 1965
Nesochoris holographa  Clarke, 1965

References

  1965: Proceedings of the United States National Museum 117: 74.

External links
tortricidae.com

Euliini
Tortricidae genera